ENB may refer to:

 Earth Negotiations Bulletin, an online publication on sustainability
 Ecurie Nationale Belge, a Formula One constructor and sports car team
 Electromagnetic navigation bronchoscopy
 ENB Beyrouth, a Lebanese sports club
 Enb Consulting, a subsidiary of Moody's Analytics
 Enbridge, a Canadian oil and natural gas company
 English National Ballet, based in London, England
 EnodeB, a UMTS base station
 Ethylidene norbornene
 Executive National Bank, an American financial institution
 First National Bank (South Africa)
 Markweta language